The Ilıca–Palamutluk Railway Line (Turkish:Ilıca–Palamutluk Demiryol Hattı) was a  narrow gauge railway route in Balıkesir Province, western Turkey that operated from 1924 until 1950. The line was built to transport galena lead ore that had been mined far to the east at Balya. The galena ore from Balya was transported to Palamutluk, a site at the base of the Aegean coast foothills, on an existing smaller-gauge line. The Ilıca–Palamutluk Line then took the ore onwards from Palamutluk via Edremit to a wharf at Ilıca on the Aegean coast.

Background
Sites in the Balıkesir area had been mined for lead, silver and other metals since prehistoric times. The Romans mined lead at Balya Maden, known to them as Pericharaxis, on Mount Ida (modern Kaz Dağı). It is thought that much of the silver in Troy II came from this mine. There is also evidence for mining during the Byzantine and Ottoman periods.

From the late 19th century, the mines at Balya were operated by the Société Anonyme Ottomane des Mines de Balia-Karaïdin (known in Turkish as Balya Kara Aydın Şirketi). Ore was initially transported to the coast by mule and camel. Later (possibly as early as 1884), the mining company built the  Palamutluk–Balya–Mancılık railway to transport lead ore down the steep mountain route to a site on the coastal plain at Palamutluk (east of Havran, between the present-day villages of İnönü and Köylüce). The Palamutluk–Balya line used the Decauville company's system of portable  narrow-gauge tracks, with animals as the motive power. Ore was then carried on wagons from Palamutluk to a pier at Akçay on the coast for export to Europe.

Construction
By the early 20th century, the terminus at Palamutluk was proving problematic and Yengi Efendi, the manager of the Balya mine, received authorization in 1917 to construct a new rail line from the coast to Palamutluk. Unsurprisingly, as the Ottoman Empire was engaged in World War I and the Turkish War of Independence, construction did not begin for several years.

In the early 1920s, Georges Ralli, the director of the Balya mine, opened negotiations with the new government of the Turkish Republic to build a "railway starting from the port of Ilidjé, on the Gulf of Edremid, and running to Palamoudlouk through Ak-Tchai, Edremid, and Hauran". Ralli's chosen site for the western terminus was the small port of Ilıca, which is now part of the village of Güre.

There appear to have been some delays to Ralli's plans, because it is recorded that he was also issued a 40-year concession to build and operate the line on 13 May 1923. Ralli transferred the rights to the "Ilıca-İskele–Palamutluk Demiryolu Türk Anonim Şirketi" (the Ilıca Pier–Palamutluk Railway Turkish Joint Stock Company, also known by the French title Société Anonyme Turque du Chemin de Fer Ilidja-Iskélé–Palamoutlouk). Other reports credit the construction directly to the French-funded Balya Kara Aydın Şirketi, with work starting on the Ilıca–Palamutluk line on 1 May 1923.

The  line was built with 750mm track as planned and opened to traffic on either 1 September or 1 November 1924 (reports vary). At Palamutluk the line connected with the  Palamutluk–Balya–Mancılık railway. Ore carried down from Balya on the animal-powered line was transferred to the new steam-powered line at Palamutluk.

Stations

The line served six principal stations and two intermediate halts:
 Ilıca, approximately 
 Akçay at 
 Zeytinli, approximately 
 Tabakhaneler (halt)
 Edremit at 
 Bostancı Köyü (halt), approximately 
 Havran, approximately 
 Palamutluk, approximately

Operation
The new Ilıca–Palamutluk line ran from Palamutluk via Havran, Bostancı, Edremit, Tabakhaneler and Zeytinli to reach the north shore of the Gulf of Edremit at Akçay, where there was a pier, and terminate at a second pier at Ilıca. Ore and passenger trains were pulled by 7-ton locomotives. Infrastructure at Havran station included a station building, a warehouse, 10-tonne railcar scale, a  baggage scale and a water reservoir.

The line's owner appears to have struggled to achieve its targets for freight and passenger usage of the line. At the company's  general meeting on 3 July 1926, shareholders heard that "the volume of traffic was rather small as the principal customer, the Sociétè de Balia, had only supplied a restricted tonnage and, on the other hand, the public has not quite yet familiarised itself with this new mode of transport". In its first 10 months of operation the line carried  of freight and 106,670 passengers. This resulted in a deficit of 19,652 Turkish lira during the period.

By 1939, the line employed 85 people. For passenger service, the railway had 10 dual-compartment carriages, each with a capacity of 32 people.

There was a 08:00 weekday departure from Havran taking students to Edremit with a return run at 18:00. In total, there were six weekdays runs between Palamutluk and Ilıca, carrying both passengers and freight. On Fridays, to serve Havran's weekly market, the railway offered a reduced tariff for animals and goods. During the summer months the railway would use all its carriages for special Sunday services to Akçay, returning late in the evening.

These summer services ran from 1 June to 15 September each year, and the railway published the timetable in advance in major newspapers for several years in the 1930s and early 1940s. During the summer period, the first passenger train left Edremit for Palamutluk at 07:00, with services through the day until 20:00, and until 22:00 on some Sundays. There were two daily departures from Palamutluk, nine from Havran, 13–14 from Edremit, 13–15 from Zeytinlik, 13–15 from Akçay and six or seven from Ilıca. No stops were scheduled at the Bostancı Köyü or Tabakhaneler halts. The schedule appears to have been planned for service by two passenger trains, with passing at Havran, Edremit, and Akçay stations. Both trains appear to have been kept at or near Edremit overnight.

The summer schedule also indicated five scheduled daily freight-only trains. Two ran east-bound, starting from Akçay, with scheduled stops at Edremit and Havran, terminating at Palamutluk. Three freight trains served the same stops west-bound. The freight services were concentrated between 10:00 and 14:00 daily, implying that the railway used at least four and maybe five locomotives for freight due to the overlapping schedule.

Plans were made in the 1930s for a "Balıkesir, Balya, Edremit and Aliağa Railway", which would have upgraded the tramway between Palamutluk and Balya to  gauge and extended the line at each end to allow service from the main line at Balıkesir all the way through to Aliağa on the coast. However, construction was never started and the ambitious project was shelved in the 1940s.

Service on the line was suspended on 15 October 1939, after which it was nationalized under Turkish State Railways (TCDD) on 13 May 1941 and service resumed on 29 October 1942. Also in the early 1940s, TCDD built a holiday camp and recreational facilities next to the Akçay station and pier. TCDD later added a retirement home for former employees at the same site.

Closure
The fate of the line was raised in the Turkish Parliament on 28 December 1945, during a debate on the 1946 budget for the Directorate General of State Railways and Ports. 

Balıkesir Representative Hayrettin Karan and Transport Minister Ali Fuat Cebesoy noted that formerly a tramway line had run from Ilıca via Edremit to Balya and stated that the Ilıca–Edremit–Palamutluk line remained in place. Karan noted that the Turkish State Railways operated passenger services along the Ilıca–Havran section whereas the Havran–Palamutluk section was unused. He outlined the benefits of connecting Burhaniye to Edremit by rail, noting that the Transport Ministry had completed a study but had shelved the project due to a shortage of materials and had chosen to put in place a bus service instead. Karan expressed his thanks for the bus service but argued that a rail line would shorten travel times and be a better long-term use of resources. In particular, he extolled the benefits of connecting manufacturing industries in the Edremit region to coal supplies from Soma.

Cebesoy proposed that part of the existing narrow-gauge line could be repurposed and extended to reach the coast via Burhaniye. He described the Palamutluk section as uneconomic, due to a lack of passengers or merchandise. In contrast, the real passenger and cargo traffic lay in the Havran–Edremit–Ilıca section, he said. Cebesoy proposed that the track could be removed from the Palamutluk section and relaid to connect with the commercial center and pier at Burhaniye. He cited the transport of coal from mines at Soma as an example of parliament's ability to boost economic output by investing in rail and tramway lines.

Cebesoy then reported the results of a study that showed that removing the tracks from the Havran–Palamutluk section and re-laying them along a route to Burhaniye would allow the railway to come within  of that town. He said the gap into Burhaniye could be bridged with other track already owned by the railway, but urged parliament to consider extending the line west of Burhaniye to a pier on the Gulf of Edremit.

In October 1950, with production falling at the Balya lead mines, the route became uneconomic and operations ceased. By 1952, parliament was debating the liquidation of the Ilıca–Palamutluk and Mudanya–Bursa lines. The rails were torn up in 1959 and sold for scrap.

Several buildings from the railway still exist, including the stations in Edremit (on İstasyon Caddesi) and Akçay (now İstasyon Restaurant).

See also
Narrow gauge railways in Turkey

References

Sources

 
 
 
 
  Cebesoy, Ali Fuat (28 December 1945), TBMM Tutanak Dergisi (Proceedings of the Turkish Parliament) Seventh Parliament, Year 4, 20 (21:1): 576–577 
 
 
  Karan, Hayrettin (28 December 1945), TBMM Tutanak Dergisi (Proceedings of the Turkish Parliament) Seventh Parliament, Year 4, 20 (21:1): 571 
 
 
 
 
 
  
 

Railway lines in Turkey
750 mm gauge railways in Turkey